The Cheviot Hills are a range of hills in Scotland and England.

Cheviot Hills may also refer to:

 Cheviot Hills, Los Angeles, a neighborhood of Los Angeles, California, U.S.
 Cheviot, New Zealand, a town in Canterbury named for the Cheviot Hills Estate
 Cheviot Hills, Alberta, Canada, a locality in Lac Ste. Anne County
 Cheviot Hills Military Academy in Culver City, California, U.S.

See also
 Cheviot (disambiguation)